Goralski may refer to:

 Buk Góralski, a village in Kuyavian-Pomeranian Voivodeship, north-central Poland
 Jacek Góralski (1992), Polish professional footballer
 Robert Goralski (1928–1988), American journalist
 Zoey Goralski (1995), American former soccer player

Polish-language surnames
Polish toponymic surnames